Mary C. Kasten is a former American Republican politician who served in the Missouri House of Representatives.

Born in or near Matthews, Missouri, she attended Matthews schools, Southeast Missouri State University, and the University of Pittsburgh.  She married Dr. Melvin C. Kasten on June 19, 1949.

References

1928 births
Living people
20th-century American women politicians
20th-century American politicians
21st-century American women politicians
Republican Party members of the Missouri House of Representatives
Women state legislators in Missouri
21st-century American politicians